Marcin Mielczewski (c. 1600 – September 1651) was, together with his tutor Franciszek Lilius and Bartłomiej Pękiel, among the most notable Polish composers in the 17th century.

By 1632 he was a composer and musician in the royal chapel in Warsaw. In 1645 he became director of music to Charles Ferdinand Vasa, the brother of King Władysław IV. Mielczewski died in Warsaw in September 1651.

His known works are largely in the concertato style, and Szweykowski suggests that the way "in which the words are given full expression" means he is likely to have composed secular vocal works in addition to the surviving sacred corpus. In his mass O glorioso domina and one of his instrumental canzonas, Mielczewski quotes popular Polish tunes; the latter is notable for being the earliest documented use of the mazurka in classical music.

Works

Masses
Missa Triumphalis a 14
Missa Cerviensiana, six voices and six instruments
Missa O Gloriosa domina, six voices and basso continuo
Missa super 'O Gloriosa Domina'

Motet 

 Ante thorum huius Virginis
 Audite et admiramini
 Audite gentes et exsultate
 Beata Dei Genitrix
 Benedictio et claritas
 Benedictus sit Deus
 Confitemini Domino
 Credidi a 8
 Credidi a 12
 Currite populi
 Dixit Dominus
 Gaude Dei Genitrix
 Gaudete omnes et exsultate
 Ingredimini omnes
 Iste cognovit
 Iubilate Deo
 Laetatus sum
 Lauda Jerusalem Dominum
 Laudate Dominum in sanctis eius
 Laudate pueri Dominum
 Magnificat octavi toni
 Magnificat primi toni
 Magnificat tertii toni
 Nisi Dominus aedificaverit domum
 O lumen Ecclesiae
 Plaudite manibus
 Quem terra, pontus, aethera
 Triumphalis dies
 Victimae paschali laudes
 Virgo prudentissima

Others 

 Canzona prima a due
 Canzona prima a tre
 Canzona quarta a tre
 Canzona quinta a tre
 Canzona seconda a due
 Canzona seconda a tre
 Canzona terza a tre
 Deus in nomine tuo
 Salve Virgo Puerpera
 Sub tuum praesidium
 Veni Domine
 Vesperae Dominicales I
 Vesperae Dominicales II

Selected recordings
Mielczewski: Complete Works Vol.1-6 Musicae Antiquae Collegium Varsoviense Lilianna Stawarz 6CDs 1998-2000
Mielczewski: Missa super O Gloriosa Domina (on Msze Staropolskie) 	Il Canto 1993 (Accord) 
Mielczewski: Virgo prudentissima; Quem terra pontus; Beata Dei Genitrix (2 Versionen); Salve virgo; Ante thorum huius virginis; Magnificat primi toni (with works by Adam Jarzebski and Mikołaj Zielenski), Weser-Renaissance 	Manfred Cordes (cpo)
Mielczewski: Virgo Prudentissima with works by Bartłomiej Pękiel)	Les Traversees, Meyer (K617) 5.99
Vesperae Dominicales, Wroclaw Baroque Ensemble 	Andrzej Kosendiak,(Accord) 2016

References

External links
Short bio

1600s births
1651 deaths
Polish Baroque composers
Polish classical composers
Polish male classical composers
17th-century classical composers
17th-century male musicians